The women's football tournament at the 2000 Summer Olympics in Sydney was held from 13 to 28 September 2000. The women's tournament was a full international tournament with no restrictions on age. The eight national teams involved in the tournament were required to register a squad of 18 players, including two goalkeepers. Additionally, teams could name a maximum of four alternate players, numbered from 19 to 22. The alternate list could contain at most three outfielders, as at least one slot was reserved for a goalkeeper. In the event of serious injury during the tournament, an injured player could be replaced by one of the players in the alternate list. Only players in these squads were eligible to take part in the tournament.

The age listed for each player is on 13 September 2000, the first day of the tournament. The numbers of caps and goals listed for each player do not include any matches played after the start of the tournament. The club listed is the club for which the player last played a competitive match prior to the tournament. A flag is included for coaches who are of a different nationality than their own national team.

Group E

Australia
Head coach:  Chris Tanzey

Australia named a squad of 18 players and 4 alternates for the tournament.

Brazil
Head coach: José Duarte

Brazil named a squad of 18 players and 4 alternates for the tournament.

Germany
Head coach: Tina Theune-Meyer

Germany named a squad of 18 players and 4 alternates for the tournament.

Sweden
Head coach: Marika Domanski-Lyfors

Sweden named a squad of 18 players and 4 alternates for the tournament.

Group F

China PR
Head coach: Ma Yuanan

China PR named a squad of 18 players and 2 alternates for the tournament.

Nigeria
Head coach: Mabo Ismaila

Nigeria named a squad of 18 players and 4 alternates for the tournament.

Norway
Head coach: Per-Mathias Høgmo

Norway named a squad of 18 players and 4 alternates for the tournament. During the tournament, Bente Kvitland replaced Anne Tønnessen due to injury.

United States
Head coach: April Heinrichs

The United States named a squad of 18 players and 4 alternates for the tournament.

References

External links
 Olympic Football Tournaments Sydney 2000 – Women, FIFA.com
 
 

Squads
2000